Keith Graham Hutchinson (7 September 1920 – April 1986) was an English footballer who made 31 appearances in the Football League playing as a full back for Darlington in the 1940s. He went on to play non-league football for Stockton.

References

1920 births
1986 deaths
Footballers from South Shields
English footballers
Association football defenders
Darlington F.C. players
Stockton F.C. players
English Football League players